Paarthale Paravasam is a 2001 Indian Tamil-language drama film directed by K. Balachander, for whom this was his 100th film. It was produced by Balachander's home banner Kavithalayaa Productions and stars Madhavan and Simran, with Raghava Lawrence and Sneha playing roles alongside them. The film's music was composed by A. R. Rahman, whilst A. Venkatesh was cinematographer. It tells the story of a couple going through a breakup after the husband is exposed for having had a child from a juvenile relationship. It also shows the introduction of love interests for the couple, and if they reconcile, forms the crux of the plot.

Paarthale Paravasam released on 14 November 2001 to mixed reviews and became a commercial failure.

Plot 
Madhava is a doctor, and a single appearance has made him the heartthrob of thousands of girls. He marries Simi, but a revelation about his past separates them and takes them as far as divorce. They remain friends though, even going so far as to fix up each other's second marriages. Simi decides to get Madhava married to Chella, a nurse at his hospital, while he tries to fix up her marriage with a dancer Azhagu. Madhava and Chella's wedding and Simi and Azhagu's wedding are on the same date. Azhagu then marries his cousin due to his father's greed for wealth. Chella's parents find out about Madhava's past and call off the wedding. In the end, Madhava and Simi remarry. Chella marries Kumaran, Madhava's colleague, who was interested in her ever since he became Madhava's understudy in the hospital.

Cast 

 Madhavan as Dr. Madhava
 Simran as Simi Madhava
 Raghava Lawrence as Azhagu
 Sneha as Chella
 Vaali as Bala
 Vivek as Dr. Kumaran
 Nizhalgal Ravi as Mudaliar
 Manivannan as Nellai Amaran
 Seema as Madhava's mother
 Vadivukkarasi as Akilam
 Radhika Chaudhari as Rekha
 Deepa Venkat as Simi's friend
 Samuthirakani as Back Pain Patient
 Cochin Haneefa
 Mohan Raman
 Mohan Vaidya
 Thalaivasal Vijay
 Kuyili
 Dr. Sharmila
 Viji Chandrasekhar
 Charle
 Dhamu
 Kavithalaya Krishnan
 Mayilsamy
 Periya Karuppu Thevar
 Kamal Haasan as himself (guest appearance)
 Ramya Krishnan as herself (guest appearance)
 Madhan Bob as Kamal Haasan's fan (uncredited)
 Yuvarani as Miss Chennai Host (uncredited)

Production 
Paarthale Paravasam was launched as Balachander's 100th film at his office in Chennai. The original cast announced on the day of the launch included noted singer S. P. Balasubrahmanyam. However, he was replaced by prominent poet Vaali before the shoot started. Moreover, Raju Sundaram was initially supposed to play the role eventually portrayed by Lawrence in the film. Balachandar managed to select Kamal Haasan in a guest appearance, but failed to do the same with Rajinikanth.

Production of the film was delayed multiple times during the shoot owing to rains in Kerala. Balachander also announced that Rahman and Simran's busy scheduled had held up the film's progress. A song for the film was shot in Malaysia featuring Madhavan and Sneha. Another was shot at Bekal Fort, Kasargod, in Kerala with Madhavan and Simran, which took five days to finish. The introduction song of Madhavan and a team of dancers was shot in Ooty, while a fourth song sequence, with Madhavan and Simran was on the floors of AVM. The fifth was picturised in the Vijaya Vauhini Studios, in sets where Lawrence and Simran danced for the fifth song.

Release and reception 
The film, upon release on 14 November 2001, garnered mixed reviews, with critics citing it as a "disappointment". A critic claimed that the dialogues were "insipid", the narration "lacklustre" and the film was "a monotonous journey for the audience". Similarly, the reviewer from Sify.com labelled the film as "insufferable" and drew criticism to the director and the lead actors, saying that only Vivek's position was the "silver lining".
Lolluexpress.com noted that "movie is a big logic failure and disappointment", and praised A. R. Rahman's music, stating that he "didn't disappoint us considering his recent tunes in "STAR" " and Simran's performance as "Simran was too good in many places and only because of her the movie has something to watch".

After the commercial failure of Paarthale Paravasam, Balachander felt that the star cast was the reason for the failure and claimed that if it been made with newcomers it would have been successful.

Music 

The soundtrack was composed by A. R. Rahman, with lyrics by Vaali, Vairamuthu and Na. Muthukumar. Guitarist Rashid Ali had his debut as a vocalist through this film. Nithyasree Mahadevan told about the making one of the songs, "We did not have any lyrics except the words "Manmadha Masam", when Shankar Mahadevan, Rahman Sir and I started it. So we worked on improvisations with those two words and sent the meter to poet Vaali. Vaali Sir was so overwhelmed with the tune that he said he did not want to pollute it with more words. So the song has a very unusual presentation with minimum lyrics." The track "Love Check" was a fusion number that had just two words "Love Check" with Sivamani's drums. The songs were choreographed by Lawrence Raghavendra; one was picturised from Malaysia. The song "Azhage Sugama" is loosely based in Sahana raga.

References

External links 
 
 Paarthale Paravasam at Bollywood Hungama

2000s Tamil-language films
2001 drama films
2001 films
Films directed by K. Balachander
Films scored by A. R. Rahman
Films with screenplays by K. Balachander
Indian drama films